Henry Frost may refer to:

 Henry Frost, better known as Harry Frost,  Canadian ice hockey player
 Henry Atherton Frost (1883–1952), American architect
 H. A. Frost (Henry Adolph Frost, 1844–1909), German-born saddler and businessman
 Henry Frost, a serial killer on season 3 of Criminal Minds
 Harry Frost (educationalist), University of London Extra-Mural Studies

See also 
Frost (surname) (for Harry Frost)